Elsa Baquerizo McMillan (born 25 June 1987) is a Spanish beach volleyball player. As of 2012, she plays with Liliana Fernández. The pair participated in the 2012 Summer Olympics tournament and were eliminated in the round of 16 by the Italians Greta Cicolari and Marta Menegatti. They again competed at the 2016 Summer Olympics, losing in the last 16 to the Russian pair of Birlova and Ukolova.

Professional career

World tour 2016

Silver medal went to Liliana and Elsa at the Long Beach, California Grand Slam where they lost to April Ross/Kerri Walsh Jennings in straight sets, 21–16, 21–16.

References

External links
 
 
 
 
 
 

1987 births
Living people
Spanish beach volleyball players
Women's beach volleyball players
Beach volleyball players at the 2012 Summer Olympics
Beach volleyball players at the 2016 Summer Olympics
Olympic beach volleyball players of Spain
Beach volleyball players at the 2020 Summer Olympics